Peter of Chichester was the Dean of Wells during 1220.

References

Deans of Wells